Bofors railway station is a railway station in Karlskoga, Sweden, located on the Nora-Carlskoga Line. In 1966, the station stopped serving passenger traffic and began to serve freight transport full-on.

The station opened on January 1, 1874.

In 1908, the yellow-colored station building was erected.

See also 

 Rail transport in Sweden

References

Works cited 

 

Bofors
Buildings and structures in Karlskoga Municipality
Railway stations in Örebro County
1874 establishments in Sweden
1966 disestablishments in Sweden